English Touring Opera (ETO) is an opera company in the United Kingdom founded in 1979 under the name Opera 80 by the then-existing Arts Council of Great Britain. In 1992 the company changed to its present name. Today it is sponsored in part by Arts Council England 

as well as receiving support from individual and corporate sponsors, plus trusts and foundations. The company aims to bring high quality opera to areas of England that would not otherwise have ready access to such productions. 
From 2002 its Director was James Conway, who came from the Opera Theatre of Ireland. It was announced in January 2022 that he was stepping down, and his successor was revealed in March 2022 as Robin Norton-Hale.

The company
Opera 80 itself became the successor to Opera For All,<ref name=NGDO>"Opera 80", The New Grove Dictionary of Opera", at Oxfordmusiconline.com</ref> an "umbrella organization" which had planned tours by small groups which performed to piano accompaniment. David Parry became music director in 1983.

ETO is a charitable organisation which seeks to stimulate access, understanding and appreciation of opera. The company has always presented operas in English and it currently tours twice each year to more venues than any other opera company in the UK, going to about 33 theatres, many of which would not normally host opera performances. These include London, Cambridge, Exeter, Poole, Cheltenham, Malvern, Crawley, Sheffield, Wolverhampton, Buxton, Durham and Perth. It is estimated that the Spring 2012 tour included "nearly 50 gigs".

As James Conway notes:
"One of the great new challenges is to show audiences that what we offer is different from the essentially passive experience of cinema relays – to point out how the actual live experience of listening and looking is incomparably better".

In Britain's economic climate of 2012, Arts Council England grants have increased by about 50% since 2002 and "English Touring Opera....will receive £1,577,015 in 2012/13, rising to £1,819,244 in 2014/15. This is expected to allow the company to sustain its current level of touring over the coming year, then to increase its programme of activity from 2012 onwards."

 Productions 

 Artists 
Singers whose early careers began with ETO often return to perform again with the company after their careers have developed further.

Singers who have performed with ETO include Sarah Connolly, Mary Plazas, Sylvia O'Brien, Todd Wilander, Jonathan Veira, Paul Nilon, Alison Hagley and Susan Gritton. Amanda Echalaz has starred in productions of Così fan tutte, Alcina, Eugene Onegin and Jenůfa.

ETO's and Opera 80's conductors have included Nicholas Kraemer, Ivor Bolton, Stephen Barlow, Martin André, David Parry and Michael Rosewell. It has also shown the early work of such directors as Richard Jones, Robert Carsen, Declan Donnellan and Steven Pimlott.

Productions of works outside the standard repertory
2006: Autumn: Baroque Festival Tour: ETO mounted a baroque opera festival with over 40 complementary events in twelve venues throughout the UK. Orfeo by Claudio Monteverdi, with Katherine Manley as Music and Euridice and Hal Cazalet as Orfeo; Erismena by Francesco Cavalli, with Andrew Slater as Erimante and Rachel Nicholls as Erismena; Jephté by Giacomo Carissimi with David Stout as Jephté and Jane Harrington as Filia; Dido & Aeneas by Henry Purcell with Joana Thomé as Dido and Patricia Orr as Sorceress; and Tolomeo by George Frederick Handel with Jonathan Peter Kenny as Tolomeo and Iestyn Morris as Alessandro2007: Spring: Die Entführung aus dem Serail (The Seraglio) by Mozart with Sion Goronwy as Osmin and Elizabeth Donovan as Constanza; and Spirit of Vienna (Wiener Blut) by Johann Strauss with Cheryl Enever as Franziska (Franzi) Cagliari and Nicky Spence as Count Balduin Zedlau.
2007: Autumn: James Conway's special interest in baroque opera was also evident with productions of Handel and Haydn. Teseo by Handel with Derek Lee Ragin as Egeo (Aegeus) and Jeni Bern as Medea; Country Matters (L'infedelta Delusa) by Joseph Haydn with Charlotte Ellett as Vespina and Jonathan Gunthorpe as Nanni; and Bridgetower by Julian Joseph.
2008: Spring: Susannah by Carlisle Floyd, Alexander Ingram, Conductor. Donna Bateman as Susannah Polk and Todd Wilander as Sam Polk.
2009: Spring: Katya Kabanova by Leoš Janáček.
2009: Autumn: Alongside a commemoration of the 250th anniversary of Handel's death, the company celebrated its 30th anniversary with presentations of Ariodante, Alcina, Flavio, Teseo and Tolomeo.
2010: Autumn: Promised End, a new opera by Alexander Goehr; and The Duenna, by Richard Brinsley Sheridan.
2011: Autumn: Baroque Treats included a revival of Handel's Flavio, Handel's Xerxes and Purcell's The Fairy Queen.
2012: Autumn: the program featured three 20th Century operas: Albert Herring by Benjamin Britten; The Emperor of Atlantis by Viktor Ullmann (paired with Cantata BWV 4 by Bach); and The Lighthouse by Peter Maxwell Davies.Rupert Christiansen, "The Lighthouse, The Emperor of Atlantis, ETO, touring, review", The Telegraph (London), 12 October 2012. Retrieved 12 October 2012.
2013: Spring: L'assedio di Calais by Donizetti.
2013: Autumn: The Coronation of Poppea by Claudio Monteverdi; Jason by Francesco Cavalli; and Agrippina by Handel.
2014: Spring: King Priam by Michael Tippett and Britten's Paul Bunyan. (It was for these two productions especially that the company won the 2014 Olivier Award for 'Outstanding Achievement in Opera'.)
2014: Autumn: Il mondo della luna by Joseph Haydn (To be presented under the title of Life on the Moon) and Ottone by Handel.
2015: Spring: Il furioso all'isola di San Domingo by Donizetti (to be presented under the title of The Wild Man of the West Indies.) L'assedio di Calais (Donizetti) will also be re-mounted.
2016: Spring: Pia de' Tolomei by Donizetti  and Iphigénie en Tauride by Gluck 2017: Spring: Patience by Gilbert and Sullivan.
2017: Autumn: Dardanus by Rameau.
2018: Spring: Rossini: Fireworks (a concert of Rossini arias)
2018: Autumn: Jonas by Carissimi and Io Tacerò (presented under the title I Will Not Speak) by Gesualdo (which were performed alongside Dido & Aeneas by Purcell). 
2019: Spring: Elisabetta, Regina d'Inghilterra by Rossini (presented under the title Elizabeth I)
2019: Autumn: Der Silbersee by Kurt Weill (presented under the title of The Silver Lake: A Winter's Tale (Der Silbersee))
2020: Autumn: Romances on British Poetry and Poems of Marina Tsvetaeva by Shostakovitch, The Poet's Echo by Britten, Tel Jour, telle nuit  by Poulenc and A Waterbird Talk by Argento.
2021: Autumn: Amadigi di Gaula by Handel (presented under the title Amadigi)
2022: Spring: The Golden Cockerel by Rimsky-Korsakov

 Outreach 
In addition to theatre-staged operatic productions, ETO focuses on relationships with communities through education and outreach programs, and organises projects for people of all ages and abilities – from on-stage workshops to residencies in schools and performances for children with special needs. Singers and musicians on tour with the ETO often step off-stage and into the classroom of outreach workshops alongside professional animateurs.

Bradley Travis is the current Artistic Associate for Learning and Participation and overseas outreach and education programs.

One of ETO's outreach programs is Creative Residencies, in which young people with disabilities engage in week-long creative workshops.  Between 2007 and 2009, these projects have included:
 House on the Moon (2007) involved a collaboration with local Wolverhampton organisations. Nearly 200 people including amateurs and professionals from every background and of every ability performed.
 Turtle Song was presented in 2008. It was a collaboration with Turtle Key Arts and the Royal College of Music which encourages people with Alzheimer's Disease or dementia to compose and sing their own songs, working alongside professional musicians.
 One Day, Two Dawns was an opera in 2009 for the Truro, Cornwall community, where a 200-member cast of local people aged 8–80 devised and rehearsed a new piece of music.
 Jack and the Beanstalk / Red Ridinghood (also 2009) was an interactive fairytale opera with pre-school students composed by Tom Smail.

Awards
In 2004 James Conway's production of A Midsummer Night's Dream was nominated for a Royal Philharmonic Society (RPS) "Best Opera" Award.

James Conway's production of Donizetti's Maria Stuarda was nominated for a South Bank Show Award in 2005.

ETO's projects Ice and Crossing the Styx were both nominated for an RPS Award in the Education Category in 2006. Ice was a devised opera for teenagers, and Crossing the Styx was a devised opera for primary school students.House on the Moon with the Wolverhampton Community Opera was nominated for an RPS Best Education Project award of 2007.

In 2010 One Day, Two Dawns with Hall for Cornwall won the RPS Education Award.Laika the Spacedog, a new opera for children aged 7 to 11, was awarded the "David Bedford Music Education Award" in 2012. It honours outstanding music education projects, and was given by The PRS For Music Foundation.  Laika the Spacedog  also won two awards for Best Production at the Armel International Opera Festival in Szeged, Hungary in 2013. The Best Production award as voted for by the members of the International Competition Jury, and Best Production from the Jury of the University of Szeged.

In the Spring of 2014, ETO was the winner of an Olivier Award in the "Outstanding Achievement in Opera" category];"ETO Wins Olivier Award for Outstanding Achievement" on englishtouringopera.org.uk. Retrieved 13 June 2014 on the Olivier Awards website, it is noted that the company won the Award for "its brave and challenging touring productions....of Michael Tippett's elegant and vibrant King Priam and Britten's rarely performed operetta Paul Bunyan. The stylishly staged pair played at the Royal Opera House's Linbury Studio Theatre in Covent Garden, London, as part of a UK tour."

2021 Dismissals
In September 2021, ETO wrote to tell 13 freelance musicians that they would not be re-engaged for the upcoming tour, but that they would stay in a pool of artists to be drawn upon in the future.  Some of the players had been engaged in freelance contracts year after year.  The players who were not engaged for the upcoming season were mid-to-late-career musicians, when sent the letter. The freelance artists had hoped to return to work in the post-pandemic period.  Zhang Zhang, a violinist with the Monte-Carlo Philharmonic Orchestra, asked if firing people because of their skin color is racism.  Zoe Strimpel wrote that ETO's "policy race-based contracting" was a "debacle." ETO indicated its policy was based on guidance from its main funder, Arts Council England.

 References 
Notes

Sources
Thicknesse, Robert, "Company Profile: English Touring Opera", Opera Now'' (London), October 2012

External links 
 English Touring Opera website

British opera companies
Musical groups established in 1979
Touring opera companies